The Palazzo Clary (Clary Palace ) is a Late Renaissance Venetian palace facing the Giudecca Canal alongside the fondamenta Zattere by the ponte longo in Venice's Dorsoduro. It was originally built in the 17th century for a Venetian noble family. In the early 19th century, the palazzo is known as Palazzo Clary, named after it was bought by the prince Clary-Aldringen. The neighboring building is Palazzo Giustinian Recanati.

Description

Originally built in the late 17th century, during the vogue of the late Venetian Renaissance revival architecture, the palazzo underwent later remodelling in the 19th century but has kept its original style unchanged. The late Renaissance palace's façade onto the Zattere has become a very recognizable landmark of Dorsoduro: it is one of the most magnificent of the district and surely the most noticeable of the Zattere.

The palazzo's architecture is typical of the Venetian Revival. It follows the Renaissance pattern of design on four floors: a hallway floor giving access to the palace from the fondamenta is surmounted by two Piano nobiles and a fourth story above them:
- the primo piano nobile, typical of Venetian neo-Renaissance style, is made of decorated columns and eight monofora windows of which four are component of an open loggia with balcony, this floor is hosting magnificent ceremonial rooms;
- the "secondo piano nobile" (secondary floor) has four monofora windows surrounding a large quadrifora closed loggia, it hosts more intimate reception spaces;
- the fourth story is of much simpler exterior design, it has eight square windows without applied decoration.

The "U"-shaped back facade is made of two paralleled wings surrounding a large garden ending onto the back canal with a richly decorated crenated wall with arched gates to the Chiesa degli Ognissanti.

History
Originally built in the 17th century for a Venetian noble family, the palace passed through different ownership, known as Palazzo Priuli-Bon, and was bought around 1855 by the Bohemian prince Edmund von Clary und Aldringen, as a residence for his father-in-law Count Karl Ludwig von Ficquelmont, a central figure of Austrian diplomacy and politics.

After World War II, while still the property of the princes Clary-und-Aldringen, part of the palace was rented to France to serve as the country's consulate general in Venice until it was moved to Trieste in the late 1990s. Today, Hieronymus, 9th Prince of Clary und Aldringen (b. 1944), and his family still occupy parts of the palace.

Bibliography
Guida d'Italia – Venezia, Touring Club Italiano, 1987, p. 451.

References 

Clary
Venetian Gothic architecture
Clary und Aldringen